George Frederick Gildea (November 10, 1831 – April 24, 1898) was a British Lieutenant Colonel of Irish origin who was notable for commanding the 69th Foot during the First Boer War.

Biography
George was born on November 10, 1831. He enlisted into service of the British Army in 1852.
 
During the First Boer War, Gildea was the primary commander of the garrison stationed at Pretoria and this led to the Battle of Elandsfontein and while the battle ended in a Boer victory, Gildea didn't consider the battle to be an extreme failure. In the official report of the battle, Gildea wrote the following:

Later in the same year, Gildea was promoted to colonel, and he died on April 24, 1898.

Family
Gildea married Fanny Power Florinda Gascoyne on March 21, 1863, in Ireland and had five children, but Fanny died after giving birth to the fifth child. Gildea later remarried to Eliza Campbell and had another child with her.

References

1831 births
1898 deaths
British military personnel of the First Boer War
19th-century British military personnel
Military personnel from County Mayo